Claude Du Bosc (also spelled Dubosc and DuBosc; –c. or after 1746) was a French engraver, publisher, and printseller who spent much of his career in London. Associated with French contemporaries such as the painter Antoine Watteau and the draftsman Hubert-François Gravelot, Du Bosc belonged to the first wave of skilled engravers to arrive in London during the early 18th century, playing a major part in improving the standard of English printmaking of that era.

Life
Nothing known of Du Bosc's early life and work; it has been usually thought since the late-19th century that Du Bosc was born in France c. 1682, likely of Protestant background. In  and Henri Béraldi's view, also from the late-19th century, Du Bosc studied engraving under Bernard Picart; an alternate point supposes him to be an associate of Gaspard Duchange. The earliest secure mentions of Du Bosc date to c. 1712–1713, when he produced two plates for Duchange's 1714 publication of Recueil de cent estampes représentant différentes nations du Levant after Jean Baptiste Vanmour. Also published by Duchange are two early prints by Du Bosc, Apollo Visiting Thetis and Leto and the Lycian peasants, both after Jean Jouvenet. 

At some point c. 1712–1713, Du Bosc and Charles Dupuis moved to England, requested to assist Nicholas Dorigny in engraving the Raphael Cartoons at Hampton Court. As George Vertue's notebooks state, Du Bosc and Dupuis quarrelled with Dorigny and left his employ before the work was complete. Later in London, Du Bosc told Dupuis that he would stay for some time before moving to France; actually, Vertue recounts, Du Bosc had decided to settle in England, so he wanted Dupuis, a more capable and thus unlikely engraver to compete with, to depart alone to Paris.

In February 1714, Du Bosc undertook with Louis Du Guernier to engrave a series of plates illustrative of the battles of the Duke of Marlborough and Prince Eugene. He sent to Paris for two more engravers, Bernard Baron and Beauvais, to assist him on the work, which was completed in 1717.

George Vertue states that towards the end of 1729 Baron and Du Bosc went over to Paris, Du Bosc wishing to arrange matters relating to the trade of print-selling, as he had now set up a shop, and that Vanloo then painted both their portraits, which they brought back to England. From Vertue's notebooks, it is known that in c. 1726, Du Bosc also sat for another portrait, painted by John Smibert.

In 1733, Dubosc published an English edition of Bernard Picart's Religious Ceremonies of All Nations, some of the plates being engraved by himself; he also invited a younger artist Hubert-François Gravelot for assistance. His other prints included Apollo and Thetis and The Vengeance of Latona, after Jouvenet; some of the Labours of Hercules and The Sacrifice of Iphigenia, after Louis Cheron; The Head of Pompey brought to Cæsar, after Bernard Picart; The Continence of Scipio, after Poussin; The Temple of Solomon, after Parmentière; a portrait of Bonaventura Giffard, and numerous book illustrations, including numerous plates for Rapin's History of England (1743). By 1743, Du Bosc was said by Vertue to be an associate of the Rose and Crown Club; according to Timothy Clayton's 2004 entry published in the Oxford Dictionary of National Biography, Du Bosc was last mentioned in the May 1746 issue of the British Magazine, as a publisher for a plan of the Battle of Culloden.

Later in the 18th century, Joseph Strutt described him as "an engraver of no great merit", adding that "his style of engraving is coarse and heavy; and the drawing of the naked parts of the figure in his plates is exceedingly defective"; Strutt's point has been long reiterated.

Gallery

Notes

References

Sources 

 
 
 
 
 
 
 
 
 
 
 
 
 
 
 
 
 
 
 
 
 
 
 
 
 
 
 
 
 
 
 
 
 
 
 
 
 
 
 
 
 
 
 
 
 
 
 
 
 
 
 
 
 
 
 
 
 
 

1682 births
1745 deaths
18th-century engravers
18th-century French people
French engravers
English engravers